James S. Robertson (born 1873) was a footballer active prior to the First World War.

Robertson's earliest known club was Chatham of the Southern League. In 1898 he joined another Kent-based club, New Brompton, where he spent three seasons and made a total of 63 Southern League appearances. In his first eleven games he played as a defender, but he then took over from Archibald Pinnell as goalkeeper for two games before returning to his outfield role. After leaving New Brompton he had a short spell with Bristol City of The Football League and later played for Accrington Stanley.

References

1873 births
Bristol City F.C. players
Accrington Stanley F.C. (1891) players
Gillingham F.C. players
English Football League players
Year of death missing
English footballers
Association football defenders
Association football goalkeepers